Pakkam is a village which is located in Chennai in the Thiruvallur District in the Indian state of Tamil Nadu. It is situated around 34 km from Chennai. Pakkam comes under Chennai Metropolitan Area and it is very close to Thirunindravur which has frequent train services.

Pakkam is an agricultural village with many temples, including Anjaneyar Temple, Sri Ellaiamman Temple, Vinayagar Temple, Sri Balambikai Samedha Thazhuvakozhundeeswarar (Sivan) Temple and Sri Sridevi Boodevi Samedha Kariamanicka Perumal Temple. A very old Chola Period temple is Aanadhieswar Temple, built 1500 years ago, for Guru Talam. Kallaa Mrram Lord Dhakshnamurthi, and Guru Parikara Thalam are available in this area.

Transport
Buses serving Pakkam:

 65C   --> Ambattur Ind. Estate to Pakkam
 563   --> Ambattur Estate - Periyapalayam via Pakkam
 580   --> Avadi - Arani
 580p  --> poonamallee to periyapalayam via Thiruninravur
 65D   --> Avadi to Melkondaiyur via Nathambedu Road Jn, Pakkam Village, Sirukalathur 
 M65H  --> Avadi via pakkam to Redhills via Tamaraipakkam

Villages in Tiruvallur district